A house of cards is a structure formed of playing cards, as a pastime.
House of Cards may also refer to:

Films
 House of Cards (1917 film), a film by Alice Guy-Blaché
 House of Cards (1943 film), a Spanish film directed by Jerónimo Mihura
 House of Cards (1968 film), a film starring George Peppard, Inger Stevens and Orson Welles
 House of Cards (1993 film), a film starring Kathleen Turner and Tommy Lee Jones

Literature
 House of Cards (Cohan book), a 2009 non-fiction book by William D. Cohan
 House of Cards (novel), a 1989 novel by Michael Dobbs

Music 
 House of Cards (album), a 2001 album by Saga
 "House of Cards" (Mary Chapin Carpenter song) (1994)
 House of Cards (Lynsey de Paul song)
 "House of Cards" (Madina Lake song) (2007)
 "House of Cards" (Radiohead song) (2007)
 "House of Cards" (James Reyne song) (1989)
"House of Cards", a song by BTS from The Most Beautiful Moment in Life: Young Forever
 "House of Cards", a song by Gang Gajang
 "House of Cards", a 1975 song by Elton John
 "House of Cards", a 2017 song by Manafest from Stones
 "House of Cards", a 2015 song by Scorpions from Return to Forever
 "House of Cards", a 2008 song by STEMM from Blood Scent
 "House of Cards", a song by The Cooper Temple Clause
 "House of Cards", a song recorded by The Seekers
 "House of Cards", a 1978 song by Richard Thompson from First Light
 "Houses of Cards", a 2000 song by Zeromancer from Clone Your Lover

Television

Series
 House of Cards (British TV series), a 1990 BBC television drama series based on the Dobbs novel
 House of Cards (American TV series), a 2013 Netflix television drama series based on the novel and UK miniseries

Episodes
 "House of Cards"  (Yes, Dear episode)
 "House of Cards", Episode 21, Season 1 of ER
 "House of Cards", an episode of Law & Order

Other uses
 House of Cards, a 1919 painting by Zinaida Serebriakova
 House of Cards, a card construction game designed by Charles Eames
 Operation House of Cards, an extensive strike by Israel in Syria against Iranian targets, on May 10, 2018